USS Little Brothers (SP-921) was a United States Navy tug in commission from 1917 to 1919.

Little Brothers was built as a commercial fishing vessel of the same name in 1910 by George Bishop at Patchogue, New York. On 21 July 1917, the U.S. Navy chartered her from her owner, John C. Doxsee of Islip, New York, for use as a tug during World War I. Assigned the section patrol number 921, she was enrolled in the Naval Coast Defense Reserve on 3 August 1917, delivered to the Navy on 13 August 1917, and commissioned at New York City as USS Little Brothers (SP-921) on 20 August 1917.

Assigned to the 3rd Naval District and based at New York City, Little Brothers was employed in carrying military supplies and ammunition for the rest of World War I and into 1919. She operated in the East River, New York Harbor, Gravesend Bay, Jamaica Bay, and Long Island Sound.

Little Brothers was decommissioned on 14 August 1919. She was returned to Doxsee on 26 August 1919.

References

SP-921 Little Brothers at Department of the Navy Naval History and Heritage Command Online Library of Selected Images: U.S. Navy Ships -- Listed by Hull Number "SP" #s and "ID" #s -- World War I Era Patrol Vessels and other Acquired Ships and Craft numbered from SP-900 through SP-999
NavSource Online: Section Patrol Craft Photo Archive Little Brothers (SP 921)

Tugs of the United States Navy
World War I auxiliary ships of the United States
Ships built in New York (state)
1910 ships